The discography of Rodney Atkins, an American country music singer, consists of 5 studio albums and 20 singles. Although Atkins first entered the Country Airplay charts in 1997 with "In a Heartbeat", he did not reach top 40 until 2002. His first top 5 hit, "Honesty (Write Me a List)", came in late 2003-early 2004. Between 2006 and 2008, Atkins charted four straight number 1 singles: "If You're Going Through Hell (Before the Devil Even Knows)", "Watching You", "These Are My People" and "Cleaning This Gun (Come On In Boy)", all from his second album, If You're Going Through Hell. It's America (2009) and Take a Back Road (2011) also included number 1 singles in their respective title tracks, with a re-issue of the latter also containing the top 5 hit "Farmer's Daughter".

Studio albums

Compilation albums

Singles

1990s and 2000s

2010s and 2020s

Notes

Music videos

References

 
 
Country music discographies
Discographies of American artists